The Life Career Award is presented by the Academy of Science Fiction, Fantasy and Horror Films, in conjunction with their annual Saturn Award ceremony.

Recipients
Below is a list of recipients and the year the award was presented:

1970s
Fritz Lang (1976)
Samuel Z. Arkoff (1977)
Christopher Lee (1979)

1980s
Gene Roddenberry (1980)
William Shatner (1980)
John Agar (1981)
Ray Harryhausen (1982)
Martin B. Cohen (1983)
Vincent Price (1986)
Leonard Nimoy (1987)
Roger Corman (1988)

1990s
Ray Walston (1990)
Arnold Schwarzenegger (1992)
David Lynch (1993)
Alfred Hitchcock (1994)
Steve Reeves (1994)
Whit Bissell (1994)
Joel Silver (1995)
Richard Fleischer (1995)
Sean Connery (1995)
Wes Craven (1995)
Albert R. Broccoli (1996)
Edward R. Pressman (1996)
Harrison Ford (1996)
Dino De Laurentiis (1997)
John Frankenheimer (1997)
Sylvester Stallone (1997)
James Coburn (1998)
James Karen (1998)
Michael Crichton (1998)
Nathan H. Juran (1999)

2000s
Dick Van Dyke (2000)
George Barris (2000)
Brian Grazer (2001)
Robert Englund (2001)
Drew Struzan (2002)
Stan Lee (2002)
Kurt Russell (2003)
Sid and Marty Krofft (2003)
Blake Edwards (2004)
Stephen J. Cannell (2005)
Thomas Rothman (2005)
Robert Halmi (2008)
Lance Henriksen (2009)

2010s
Irvin Kershner (2010)
Bert Gordon (2011)
Michael Biehn (2011)
Frank Oz (2012)
James Remar (2012)
Jonathan Frakes (2013)
Malcolm McDowell (2014)
Nichelle Nichols (2016)
Lee Majors (2017)

External links
 Official Saturn Awards website

Career awards
Fantasy awards
Lifetime achievement awards
Mass media science fiction awards
Saturn Awards